= Utopic Software =

Persystent Suite
- Type: Private
- Industry: Computer software
- Founded: 1998
- Headquarters: Tampa, FL, United States
- Website: utopicsoftware.com

Utopic Software, formerly Persystent Software, is a privately held computer software company with offices in Tampa, Florida, USA, specializing in automated PC repair, self-healing operating system repair, imaging and secure hard drive wipe. Utopic Software acquired Persystent Technologies in 2012. Utopic retained the Persystent brand and rebuilt the solution as a cohesive and centralized suite of features.

== Technology ==
Utopic Software developed patented technology that restores application and operating system (O/S) files in as little as 45 seconds. The product is called Persystent Suite for Windows-based PCs. The PC repair technology can be automated to perform repair upon each reboot or it can be managed on demand for more flexibility.
